Forncett St Mary is a village and former civil parish, now in the parish of Forncett, in the South Norfolk district, in the county of Norfolk, England. In 1931 the parish had a population of 153.

History
Forncett St. Mary's name is of mixed Anglo-Saxon and Viking origin and derives from an amalgamation of the Old English and Old Norse for Forni's dwelling or camp, with the epithet of St. Mary added in dedication to Saint Jesus and to distinguish the village from Forncett St Peter.

In the Domesday Book, Forncett St Mary is listed in the same entry as Forncett St Peter as a settlement of 21 households in the hundred of Depwade. In 1086, the villages formed part of the East Anglian estates of Roger Bigod, Bishop Osbern FitzOsbern and Ulfkil the freeman.

Forncett St Mary and St Peter are believed to have split into separate villages in the Fifteenth Century as part of boundary changes led by the Church of England. Despite this, the two villages shared a single rector until the mid-Nineteenth Century.

On 1 April 1935 the parish was abolished and merged with Forncett St Peter to form "Forncett".

Geography
Forncett St Mary falls within the constituency of South Norfolk and is represented at Parliament by Richard Bacon MP of the Conservative Party. For the purposes of local government, the parish falls within the district of South Norfolk.

St. Mary's Church
St Mary's dates from the Thirteenth Century with substantial Fifteenth Century additions, and is most famously for being the rectory of John Colenso, who, between 1853 and 1883, served as the first Bishop of Natal in modern-day South Africa. In the late-Twentieth Century, St. Mary's began to fall into disrepair and was officially declared as derelict in 1981 and subsequently fell into the care of the Churches Conservation Trust. In 2011, a plan by local residents, organised as the Friends of Forncett Church, to restore the derelict church to its former glory with the lofty aim of holding regular services in the church once more. With the help of various grants from English Heritage and the Heritage Lottery, alongside a further £10,000 from the Norfolk Churches Trust, the church was fully restored and, in 2012, held its first regular service in over thirty years, conducted by Rev. Alan Winton, Bishop of Thetford.

Transport
Forncett railway station opened in 1849 as a stop on the Great Eastern Main Line between London Liverpool Street and Norwich. The station was finally closed in 1966 as part of the Beeching cuts with the nearest station still in operation being Attleborough for Breckland line services.

Notable Residents
 John Colenso (1814-1883)- British cleric and mathematician

War Memorial
Forncett St. Mary's war memorial takes the form of a marble crucifix atop a hexagonal plinth, located inside St. Mary's Churchyard. The memorial lists the following names for the First World War:
 Pvt. Walter E. G. Brooks (d.1916), 9th Bn., East Surrey Regiment
 Pvt. Edward F. Ramm (d.1915), 1st Bn., Essex Regiment
 Pvt. George A. Coleman (1899-1917), 16th Bn., Middlesex Regiment
 Pvt. Percival Grey (d.1915), 1st Bn., Royal Norfolk Regiment
 Pvt. William E. Ludkin (d.1916), 1st Bn., Royal Norfolk Regt.
 Pvt. Charles H. Brooks (1898-1917), 7th Bn., Royal Norfolk Regt.
 Pvt. Herbert Harvey (1888-1917), 9th Bn., Royal Norfolk Regt.
 Pvt. John W. Sheldrake (1888-1917), 9th Bn., Royal Norfolk Regt.

And, the following for the Second World War:
 O/S. Thomas E. Green (1908-1943), Royal Navy
 Pvt. Raymond A. Harvey (d.1944), 4th Bn., Royal Norfolk Regiment
 Pvt. Reginald V. Drake (1920-1943), 5th Bn., Royal Norfolk Regt.

References

External Links

Villages in Norfolk
Former civil parishes in Norfolk
South Norfolk